The Prague Plateau is a plateau and a geomorphological mesoregion of the Czech Republic. It is located in the area of Prague and in the Central Bohemian Region.

Geomorphology
The Prague Plateau is a mesoregion of the Brdy Macroregion within the Bohemian Massif. It is a denudation plateau with neogene aligned surfaces. Inselbergs and structural ridges are a characteristic element of the relief. The plateau is further subdivided into the microregions of Říčany Plateau and Kladno Table.

The area is rich in low peaks.

Geography
The territory roughly stretches from the northwest (Slaný) to the southeast (Říčany).

The area is crossed by the Vltava river valley, which forms the so-called Prague Valley. Other watercourses include mostly small tributaries of the Vltava, the longest of which are the streams Rokytka and Botič.

Most of Prague, after which the mesoregion is named, lies in the territory of Prague Plateau. Other large settlements in the territory are Kladno, Slaný, Jesenice, Hostivice and Úvaly, and partly Kralupy nad Vltavou and Říčany.

Vegetation
The landscape is today heavily urbanized, with the more rural areas being sparsely forested and having a predominantly agricultural character. The only part more forested is the southeast, in the area of the Bohemian Karst Protected Landscape Area.

Gallery

References

Landforms of the Czech Republic
Bohemia
Plateaus of Europe